Mehmedalija Čović (born 16 March 1986) is a Bosnian-Herzegovinian former professional footballer who played as a centre-back.

Club career
This tall defender also played for FK Sloboda Tuzla in the Premier League of Bosnia and Herzegovina. His career began in the same club, but he also played for  Zrinjski Mostar.

References

External links
 
 
 
 

1986 births
Living people
People from Srebrenik
Association football central defenders
Bosnia and Herzegovina footballers
Bosnia and Herzegovina under-21 international footballers
Bosnia and Herzegovina international footballers
FK Sloboda Tuzla players
FK Budućnost Banovići players
K.A.A. Gent players
K.S.V. Roeselare players
NK IB 1975 Ljubljana players
NK Čelik Zenica players
FC Zhetysu players
NK Zvijezda Gradačac players
FK Mladost Doboj Kakanj players
TSG Neustrelitz players
TuS Erndtebrück players
Premier League of Bosnia and Herzegovina players
Belgian Pro League players
Slovenian PrvaLiga players
Regionalliga players
Landesliga players
Oberliga (football) players
Bosnia and Herzegovina expatriate footballers
Expatriate footballers in Belgium
Bosnia and Herzegovina expatriate sportspeople in Belgium
Expatriate footballers in Slovenia
Bosnia and Herzegovina expatriate sportspeople in Slovenia
Expatriate footballers in Kazakhstan
Bosnia and Herzegovina expatriate sportspeople in Kazakhstan
Expatriate footballers in Germany
Bosnia and Herzegovina expatriate sportspeople in Germany